Gaekwad (also spelt Gaikwar and Gaikwad) is a surname native to the Indian state of Maharashtra. The surname is found among the Marathas, Kolis and in Scheduled castes. It is also a common surname among Bharadis, Dhor, and Mahar communities of Maharashtra.

Etymology
The Marathi historian D.S. Parasnis and his co-author, the British Raj High Court judge, C.A. Kincaid of colonial-era India, wrote in 1908 that the origin of the name Gaekwad is a combination of two Marathi words. In  means cow and  means small door. Therefore, gaekwad (or gaikwad) denotes cow door.

Notable people
Notable people with the surname include:
 Gaekwads of Baroda - Maharajas of Baroda State
 Keerti Gaekwad Kelkar (born 1974), an Indian television actress and model
 Anshuman Gaekwad, a former Indian cricketer and two-time Indian national cricket coach
 Shivaji Rao Gaekwad, known by his stage name Rajinikanth, an Indian actor and politician
 Sunil Gaikwad Member of Parliament 16th, Maharashtra
 Ravindra Gaikwad, a member of the 16th Lok Sabha of India
 Hiralal Gaekwad, an Indian cricketer who played in one Test in 1952
 Rajeshwari Gayakwad, Indian women cricketer
 Ruturaj Gaikwad, Maharashtra domestic and Chennai Super Kings Cricketer
 Raju Gaikwad, professional footballer

See also
 Caste system in India

References

Indian surnames
Maratha clans
Koli clans